Gamharia is a village in the Gaya district of the Indian state of Bihar.

Commerce 
The main markets are Sherghati, Chandiastan, Darioura and Gola Bazar (among the largest cattle markets in Bihar).

History 
Gamharia experienced an Indian socialist revolution where the late Sri Tileswar Singh began his dramatically violent protests against the British in India. 

His son, Late Sri Kedar Singh, works on development of the panchayat and became Mukhiya of Guneri Panchayat six consecutive times, earning him the nickname 'Mukhiyaji' after the Bihar Panchayat Election.

Notables 

 Dr. Rajendra Prasad 
 Sri Tileshwar Singh
 Sri Kedar Singh ( Mukhiyaji)
 Shakil Ahmad of Sihuli, former MLA of Gurua.
 Aditya Prasad (of the Sherghati Darbar House) was among the first in town to get a degree in engineering, in London in 1924. 
 Subodh Kumar Gupta I.A.S. Jharkhand Cadre 
 Professor Sheo Kumar Singh ( Department of Sociology)
 Storyteller Prabhat Manjudarshi 
 Professor Deepak Kumar Singh

Geography

National Highway 2 passes through Gamharia, along with State highway 69. It is located on the Amritsar Delhi Kolkata industrial corridor.

Transport

Roadways
The Grand Trunk Road (NH-2) has undergone a revival through The Golden Quadrilateral project) crosses from Gamharia.

Rail 
The nearest Railway Station, Gaya, is connected to Patna, Ranchi, Jamshedpur, Bokaro, Rourkela, Hazaribag, Kolkata, Varanasi, Allahabad, Kanpur, Delhi, Amritsar,

Airports 
The nearest airport is Gaya Airport, the only international airport in Bihar and Jharkhand. Sri Lankan Airlines, Drukair and Thai Airways connect Gaya to international destinations. Gaya Airport is 5 km from Bodh-Gaya.

Cuisine
Gamharia prefers a traditional Bihari cuisine.

Education 
The educational climate in Chandisthan has improved (at least at the school level) since DAV Public School opened its branch in town (around 1992). Locals tend to search elsewhere for higher studies.

Schools
  Anugrah Narayan Shahdev High School (Suggi, Chandisthan)
  Zenith Public School (Chandisthan)
  Lakshami Devi Sarswati Shishu Mandir (Karamdih, Chandisthan)
  Urdu Publick School (Gamharia)
  Dr Zaheer Tishna Memorial School (co-education)
  Ranglal High School (Sherghati)
  DAV Public School (co-education)
  Gurukul Residential School (Sherghati)
  Ramlal & Syam Lal Sanskrit Vidyalaya (Mahmadpur)
  Gyan Deep Public School (Sherghati)
  Heaven flower academy, jail road, Hamzapur, (Sherghati)

Universities and colleges

  Shri Mahant Shatanand Giri College (Hamzapur, Sherghati)
  Colour craft- A School of Designing & Printing

References

See also
Gaya
Sherghati
Bodhgaya

 Villages in Gaya district